Mary Adamson Marshall ( Anderson; 1837–1910) was a physician and a member of the Edinburgh Seven, the first women to study medicine at the University of Edinburgh.

Early life and education
Mary Adamson Anderson was born on 17 January 1837, in Boyndie, Banffshire, Scotland. Her father was Rev. Alexander Govie Anderson, and her mother was Mary Gavin (née Mann).

Marshall began her medical training at the University of Edinburgh, and is considered one of the Edinburgh Seven alongside Emily Bovell, Matilda Chaplin, Helen Evans, Sophia Jex-Blake, Edith Pechey and Isabel Thorne. When in 1872 the University of Edinburgh decided that women medical students would not be awarded a degree, Anderson continued her studies in Paris.

In 1879, she received her medical doctorate from the Faculté de médecine de Paris, where she wrote her thesis on mitral stenosis and its higher frequency in women than in men ("Du rétrécissement mitral : sa fréquence plus grande chez la femme que chez l'homme.").

Career 
Marshall was a senior physician at the New Hospital for Women, Marylebone.

Personal life 
Marshall's husband was Claud Marshall. In 1910, Marshall died.

Awards and honours 
The Edinburgh Seven were awarded the posthumous honorary MBChB at the University of Edinburgh’s McEwan Hall on Saturday 6 July 2019. The degrees were collected on their behalf by a group of current students at Edinburgh Medical School. The graduation was the first of a series of events planned by the University of Edinburgh to commemorate the achievements and significance of the Edinburgh Seven.

References

1837 births
1910 deaths
19th-century Scottish medical doctors
19th-century women physicians
Scottish women medical doctors
Alumni of the University of Edinburgh